The 1919–20 Michigan Wolverines men's basketball team represented the University of Michigan in intercollegiate basketball during the 1919–20 season. The team compiled a record of 10–13, and 3–9 against Big Ten Conference opponents.  The University of Chicago won the Big Ten championship with a 10–2 record in conference play.  Michigan finished in seventh place out of ten teams.  E. J. Mather was in his first year as the team's coach, and Ralph O. Rychener was the team captain.

The 1920 Michiganensian wrote that Jack Williams was "the outstanding individual player of the 1920 season" and noted that he led a late season rally.  Arthur Karpus was the team's leading scorer with 75 points in eight conference games on 22 field goals and 31 free throws.  R. Jerome Dunne was the second leading scorer with 54 points in 12 games on 27 field goals and zero free throws.  Walter B. Rea scored 47 points in 12 conference games on 18 field goals and 11 free throws.  Benjamin Weiss ranked fourth in scoring with 18 points on seven field goals and four free throws in seven conference games.

In November 1919, The Michigan Alumnus announced the hiring of E. J. Mather as the new head basketball coach and assistant coach in football and baseball.  Mather had been a three-sport athlete at Lake Forest College in Illinois and thereafter became the athletic director at Kalamazoo College.  His basketball teams won the M.I.A.A. championship in all five seasons that Mather was there.  With the hiring of Mather, Elmer Mitchell became Michigan's director of intramural athletics and athletic editor of The Michigan Alumnus.  Mitchell published an article titled, "The Game of Basketball" in the January 1920 issue of the Alumnus.  Mitchell wrote that basketball was Michigan's newest varsity sport and ranked fourth in popularity behind football, baseball, and track.  He noted that basketball at Michigan was "fighting an uphill game to strengthen its prestige" and had features that were "practically unknown to the Michigan following."  Mather began pre-season workouts in November with a squad of approximately 35 candidates.

Schedule

Players

Borinstein - aMa letter winner
Hugh Cook, Grand Rapids, Michigan - forward and aMa letter winner
R. Jerome Dunne, Chicago, Illinois - center and varsity letter winner
Milton B. Gevirtz (sometimes Gervirtz), Whiting, Indiana - forward and aMa letter winner
William P. Henderson, Detroit, Michigan - forward and varsity letter winner
Arthur Karpus, Grayling, Michigan - forward and varsity letter winner
Mason
Charles C. Merkel, Ann Arbor, Michigan - guard
Robert S. Peare, Rockville, Indiana - guard and varsity letter winner
Charles L. Pearman, Verona, New York - forward and aMa letter winner
Walter B. Rea - forward and varsity letter winner
Edward E. Ruzicka, Chicago, Illinois - scored two points on one field goal in a conference game.
Ralph O. Rychener, Archbold, Ohio - guard and varsity letter winner
Benjamin Weiss, Newark, New Jersey - guard and varsity letter winner
Jack G. Williams - guard and varsity letter winner
Wilford C. Wilson - guard and varsity letter winner

Scoring statistics

The scoring statistics do not include games against Oakland Motor (12/31/1919), Champion Ignition (1/1/1920), Illinois (1/26/1920), Michigan Agricultural (2/28/1920), Ohio State (3/13/1920), and Indiana (3/16/1920).

Coaching staff
E. J. Mather - coach
Clayton S. Shoemaker - manager
Philip Bartelme - graduate director

References

Michigan
Michigan Wolverines men's basketball seasons
Michigan Wolverines basketball
Michigan Wolverines basketball